Leviathan (Leviafan) is a 2014 Russian crime drama film directed by Andrey Zvyagintsev, co-written by Zvyagintsev and Oleg Negin, and starring Aleksei Serebryakov, Elena Lyadova, and Vladimir Vdovichenkov. 

According to Zvyagintsev, the story of Marvin Heemeyer's 2004 rampage through a small US town using a modified bulldozer inspired him. A similar concept was adapted into a Russian setting.  The character development of the protagonist parallels a 
biblical figure Job and the story of Naboth's Vineyard. The producer Alexander Rodnyansky has said: "It deals with some of the most important social issues of contemporary Russia while never becoming an artist's sermon or a public statement; it is a story of love and tragedy experienced by ordinary people". Critics noted the film as being formidable, dealing with quirks of fate, power and money.

The film was selected to compete for the Palme d'Or in the main competition section at the 2014 Cannes Film Festival. Zvyagintsev and Negin won the award for Best Screenplay. The film was judged the best film of the year at the 2014 BFI London Film Festival and the 45th International Film Festival of India. It won the Best Foreign Language Film award at the 72nd Golden Globe Awards. and the Asia Pacific Screen Award for Best Feature Film in 2014. It was also nominated for an Academy Award for Best Foreign Language Film at the 87th Academy Awards. It was picked as the 47th greatest film since 2000 in a 2016 critics' poll by BBC.

Plot

In a northern Russian coastal town lives Kolya, a hotheaded car mechanic, his second wife Lilya and his teenage son, Roma. The town's corrupt Mayor Vadim is plotting legal chicanery to expropriate the beautiful seaside land on which Kolya's house is built. The city is forcefully compensating Kolya with a grossly undervalued sum, and Kolya believes the mayor wants the land to build a villa for himself. Kolya's old friend Dima, a sharp and successful lawyer from Moscow, arrives in town to fight the expropriation through the local court system.

After the court rules in favor of the expropriation, Kolya is arrested at the police station for shouting at the officers, and no one in government will accept Dima's new criminal filing against the mayor. However, Dima meets with the mayor, extorting him with a thick folder of incriminating evidence proving his past crimes. A shocked mayor agrees to release Kolya and pay 3.5 million rubles. In a local hotel room, Dima and Lilya have an affair.

The next day the family and Dima attend the seaside, birthday cookout of Kolya's friend Ivan Stepanich, where a child runs to the group saying that he just saw Dima choking Lilya. Kolya runs to find them. Afterward, Dima and Lilya drive back silent together, both with facial bruises. Meanwhile, Mayor Vadim goes for help to one of his crony bosses, the Russian Orthodox Church bishop, who tells him that all power comes from God and encourages him to stop whining to him and solve his problems forcefully. When Dima next meets with the mayor to finalize the payment, the mayor's thugs beat Dima and the mayor carries out a mock execution, advising him to return to Moscow. A conciliatory Lilya returns home to Kolya, but is depressed. Dima stands sadly looking out the window of a moving train.

While the family is packing to move out, Kolya forces himself on Lilya, and Roma accidentally glimpses them in intercourse and flees the house, collapsing in tears by a whale skeleton on the shore. He returns home late, screaming that Lilya leave forever. That night Lilya is unable to sleep, and instead of going to work in the morning, she goes alone to the ocean cliff. When she turns up missing, Kolya desperately searches for her and increases his already very heavy consumption of vodka. Her body is discovered a few days later on the shore. A mournful, drunk Kolya asks the local Orthodox priest why God is doing this to him. The pious priest, quotes from the Biblical book of Job, and counsels Kolya that, when Job accepted his fate, he was rewarded with a long and happy life.

The next morning Kolya is arrested for murder. The prosecutor claims to have evidence that Kolya had sex with Lilya, killed her with his hammer, and threw her into the sea to hide it. Evidence includes his and Lilya's own friends' testimonies about threats he made to Lilya and Dima when he discovered them having sex at the cookout. Kolya is convicted and sentenced to fifteen years. With no family left, Roma reluctantly agrees to be taken in by Kolya's former friends, to avoid being sent to an orphanage. Mayor Vadim receives a call informing him of Kolya's sentence, and the mayor gloats that Kolya will now know to keep in his place. Kolya's house is torn down. 

The bishop gives a sermon extoling the virtues of God's truth versus the world's truth, and says that good intentions do not excuse evil acts. He urges the congregation, with the mayor attending, not to act with force or cunning, but to put their trust in Christ. The mayor finalizes the plans for a lavish church on Kolya's old property, and he and other local leaders drive away in their luxury European cars.

Cast
 Aleksei Serebryakov as Kolya
 Roman Madyanov as Vadim, the mayor
 Vladimir Vdovichenkov as Dima, the lawyer friend
 Elena Lyadova as Lilya
 Sergey Pokhodaev as Roma
 Anna Ukolova as Anzhela
 Igor Savochkin as investigator
 Margarita Shubina as Goryunovа,  the prosecutor

Production
When Andrey Zvyagintsev produced a short film in the United States, he was told the story of Marvin Heemeyer. He was amazed by this story and wanted initially to make his film in the US, but then changed his mind. The screenplay was written by Zvyagintsev and Oleg Negin and is loosely adapted from the biblical stories of Job from Uz and King Ahab of Samaria and Heinrich von Kleist's novella Michael Kohlhaas. The script features more than fifteen characters, which is unusually many for a film by Zvyagintsev.

Principal photography took place in towns Kirovsk, Monchegorsk, Olenegorsk, near Murmansk on the Kola Peninsula. Preparations on the set began in May 2013. Principal photography took place during three months from August to October the same year. Filming of exterior scenes for Leviathan took place in the town of Teriberka on the Barents Sea coast.

Release
Leviathan premiered at the 2014 Cannes Film Festival, where it was screened on 23 May. It is distributed by Sony Pictures Classics in the United States, Curzon Cinemas in the United Kingdom and by Palace Entertainment in Australia and New Zealand.

The soundtrack includes an extract from the 1983 opera Akhnaten by Philip Glass.

Critical reception
Peter Bradshaw, writing a full five-star review for The Guardian, gave the film great praise. Bradshaw thought that the film was "acted and directed with unflinching ambition" and described the film as "a forbidding and intimidating piece of work... a movie with real grandeur". Finding parallels with the Book of Job, The New York Review of Books equated the villains with "Leviathan itself" and three characters (played by Vladimir Vdovichenkov, Aleksey Rozin and Anna Ukolova) with Job's three friends.

On review aggregator website Rotten Tomatoes, the film has an approval rating of 97% based on 150 reviews, and an average rating of 8.6/10. The website's critical consensus reads, "Leviathan lives up to its title, offering trenchant, well-crafted social satire on a suitably grand scale." On Metacritic, based on 34 reviews, Leviathan holds an average score of 92 out of 100, indicating "universal acclaim".

Criticism
Thirty-five percent of the funding for Leviathan came from Russia's Ministry of Culture. Vladimir Medinsky, the then Minister of Culture and a conservative historian, acknowledged that the film showed talented moviemaking but said that he did not like it. He sharply criticized its portrayal of ordinary Russians as swearing, vodka-swigging people, which he does not recognize from his experience as a Russian or that of "real Russians". He thought it strange that there is not a single positive character in the movie and implied that the director was not fond of Russians but rather "fame, red carpets and statuettes".  In 2015 the Ministry of Culture  proposed guidelines which would ban movies that "defile" the national culture.  

In turn, when appearing on oppositional TV channel Dozhd, director Zvyagintsev was criticised by journalist Ksenia Sobchak for accepting government subsidies. Specifically, Sobchak asked whether government funding had had no influence on the content of the movie. In response, Zvyagintsev maintained that he had always felt completely independent from the Ministry in writing and shooting the movie.

Vladimir Pozner, a veteran Russian journalist, said: "Anything seen as being critical of Russia in any way is automatically seen as either another Western attempt to denigrate Russia and the Eastern Orthodox Church, or it's the work of some kind of fifth column of Russia-phobes who are paid by the West to do their anti-Russian work or are simply themselves profoundly anti-Russian."

Metropolitan Simon of Murmansk and Monchegorsk, the diocese where the movie was filmed, issued a statement calling it "honest". He said that Leviathan raised important questions about the state of the country.

Accolades
On 28 September 2014, it was announced that Leviathan would be Russia's submission for the Academy Award for Best Foreign Language Film at the 87th Academy Awards. It made the January Shortlist of nine films, before being nominated later that month.

The film was named the Best Film at the London Film Festival Awards on 18 October 2014, at a ceremony where the main prizes went to Russia, Ukraine and Syria, three countries at the centre of long-running conflicts. The winning film-makers all said they hoped that culture could help to restore peace to their countries. It was nominated for and won the Best Foreign Language Film award at the 72nd Golden Globe Awards. The film was adjudged the best film of the 45th International Film Festival of India.

Following the Golden Globe Award, Leviathan was leaked online among some of the other Oscar 2015 nominated films. On 12 January the website "Thank you, Leviathan filmmakers" appeared on the internet encouraging social media users to contribute any amount as a gratitude to the filmmakers. Alexander Rodnyanskiy, Leviathan's producer, supported the initiative of Slava's Smirnov (the website's author and an independent digital producer) and asked to transfer the money to the Podari Zhizn charity fund which is held by actresses Chulpan Khamatova and Dina Korzun.

See also
 List of submissions to the 87th Academy Awards for Best Foreign Language Film
 List of Russian submissions for the Academy Award for Best Foreign Language Film

References

External links
 "Thank you, Leviathan filmmakers. Fight piracy with charity"
 
 
 
 
 

2014 films
2014 crime drama films
Russian crime drama films
2010s Russian-language films
Films directed by Andrey Zvyagintsev
Films scored by Philip Glass
Best Foreign Language Film Golden Globe winners
Best Film, London Film Festival winners
Best Foreign Film Guldbagge Award winners
Book of Job
Films about corruption
Films set in Russia
Films shot in Russia
Sony Pictures Classics films
Russian Orthodox Church in Russia
Films about Orthodoxy